Chicony Electronics Co., Ltd. is a Taiwan-based multinational electronics manufacturer. Its product lineup includes input devices, power supplies and digital image products. It offers desktop keyboards, mobile keyboards, digital cameras, personal-computer cameras, integrated webcams and digital video cameras. It has also been a well known manufacturer of motherboards for personal computers and notebooks. The company was founded in 1983 and is based in Taipei, Taiwan. As of 2009 it has operations in Australia, Brazil, Canada, China, the Czech Republic, Germany, Ireland, Japan, Mexico, the Philippines, Singapore, Thailand, Taiwan, the United Kingdom and the United States.

Notable clients have included HP, GoPro, Google, Amazon, Dropcam, Lenovo, Valve, etc.

See also
 Rabbit 286
 List of companies of Taiwan

References

1983 establishments in Taiwan
Electronics companies established in 1983
Electronics companies of Taiwan
Taiwanese brands